O'Keefe is a surname of Irish origin. People with that name include:

 Andrew O'Keefe (born 1971), Australian TV personality
 Arthur J. O'Keefe (1876–1943) American banker and mayor of New Orleans
 Brian O'Keefe (baseball) (born 1993), American baseball player
 Dan O'Keefe (born 1929), a former member of the California state Senate
 Daniel O'Keefe (1928–2012), editor and author, original inventor of Festivus
 Daniel J. O'Keefe (born 1950), American communication and argumentation theory scholar
 Danny O'Keefe (born 1943), American singer-songwriter based in Seattle, Washington
 David Dean O'Keefe (born circa 1824 or 1828, died 1901), Irishman who created stone money and became the virtual king of the island of Yap
 Dennis O'Keefe (1908–1968), American film actor
 Dennis O'Keefe, the mayor of St. Johns, Newfoundland, Canada
 Derrick O'Keefe (born 1977), Canadian progressive writer, political activist and blogger
 Eamonn O'Keefe (born 1953), English-born Irish former professional footballer
 Eric O'Keefe (born 1961), American author, editor, and journalist
 Eugene O'Keefe (1827–1913) founder of the O'Keefe Brewery in Toronto
 Frank O'Keefe (1912–1989), Australian politician
 Frank O'Keefe (footballer) (1898–1958), Australian footballer
 Gerald Francis O'Keefe (1917–2000), Catholic bishop of Davenport, Iowa, USA
 James O'Keefe (born 1984), American conservative videographer
 Jodi Lyn O'Keefe (born 1978), American actress and model
 Jeremiah Joseph O'Keefe (1923–2016), American politician
 Jeremiah Joseph O'Keefe IV (1946–2007), American politician
 Joseph "Specs" O'Keefe, one of the participants in the Great Brinks Robbery
 Ken O'Keefe (born 1953), American college football coach
 Kerin O'Keefe (fl. 2000s–2020s), American wine critic and author
 Laurence O'Keefe (disambiguation)
 Marcy O'Keefe (born 1955), American tennis player
 Mark O'Keefe (politician) (born 1952), American politician
 Michael A. O'Keefe (born 1942), Australian-American physicist
 Michael O'Keefe, (born 1955), American film and television actor
 Michael O'Keefe (Louisiana politician) (1931–2021), American politician; convicted felon
 Molly O'Keefe (fl. 2000s–2020s), American author
 Neil O'Keefe (born 1947), retired Australian politician and lobbyist
 Phil O'Keefe (1948–2020), British geographer and development specialist
 Ryan O'Keefe (born 1981), Australian Football League player
 Sean O'Keefe (born 1956), Chancellor of Louisiana State University, former NASA administrator and aerospace industry executive
 Steve O'Keefe (born 1984), Australian cricketer and current New South Wales player
 Richard O'Keefe (fl. 1990s), computer scientist
 Thomas O'Keefe (born 1964), American musician known for his work in the group Antiseen
 Walter O'Keefe (1900–1983), American songwriter, actor and syndicated columnist

See also
 Carling O'Keefe, a brewing conglomerate in Canada

Surnames
Anglicised Irish-language surnames
Surnames of Irish origin
Surnames of British Isles origin